To celebrate the bi-centenaries of the First Fleet and of the French Revolution, in 1988 and 1989 respectively, the French Rugby Union donated the Trophée des Bicentenaires ("Trophy of the Bicentenaries") to be played in perpetuity between the two countries. It is a bronze sculpture featuring two players in a tackle. Although the trophy dates from 1988, it was first contested in 1989.

Matches

Results
 – Summer Test
 – Autumn International

See also

History of rugby union matches between Australia and France

References

External links

History of rugby union matches between Australia and France
Rugby union international rivalry trophies
International rugby union competitions hosted by Australia
International rugby union competitions hosted by France
1989 establishments in France
1989 establishments in Australia